Philip Bennet (1795 – 17 August 1866) was a British Conservative Party politician.

He was elected to the House of Commons as one of the two Members of Parliament (MPs) for the Western division of Suffolk at a by-election in October 1845 following the death of the sitting MP Robert Rushbrooke. Bennet held the seat until the stood down at the 1859 general election.

References

External links 
 

1795 births
1866 deaths
Conservative Party (UK) MPs for English constituencies
UK MPs 1841–1847
UK MPs 1847–1852
UK MPs 1852–1857
UK MPs 1857–1859